Guadeloupe has a population of 375,693 (2021).

Population
According to INSEE Guadeloupe had an estimated population of 403,977 on January 1, 2012. Life expectancy at birth is 77.0 years for males, and 83.5 for females (figures for 2011).

Languages
French is the official language, taught in the school system. Antillean Creole French is spoken by a large part of the population, understood by nearly all, and taught in some schools. A 2007 document issued by the Organisation internationale de la Francophonie estimated the population to be 80.2% "francophone" and 14.9% "partially francophone".

Vital statistics

The following vital statistics include Saint Martin and Saint Barthélemy.

 Excluding data for Saint Barthélemy and Saint Martin

Structure of the population 

Structure of the population (01.01.2010) (Provisional estimates) (Excluding data for Saint Barthélemy and Saint Martin):

References

 
Society of Guadeloupe